Richard Bernard Littlefield (March 18, 1926 – November 20, 1997) was an American Major League Baseball pitcher with the Boston Red Sox, Chicago White Sox, Detroit Tigers, St. Louis Browns / Baltimore Orioles, Pittsburgh Pirates, St. Louis Cardinals, New York Giants, Chicago Cubs and the Milwaukee Braves between 1950 and 1958. He was born and died in Detroit.

He was traded (along with $30,000 cash) by the New York Giants to the Brooklyn Dodgers for Jackie Robinson on December 13, 1956. However, Robinson refused to report to the Giants, choosing instead to retire, and the trade was voided. Moreover, Littlefield was known as one of the most well-traveled and frequently-traded players prior to the free agency era, appearing for nine of the 16 MLB franchises in existence before 1961—ten, including his brief assignment to the Dodgers' winter roster during the 1956–57 offseason.

Littlefield served in the United States Navy during World War II before embarking on his 17-season (1946–62) professional baseball career. During his nine years in the majors, he posted a 33–54 record and a 4.71 earned run average in 243 games and 761 innings pitched, allowing 750 hits and 413 bases on balls, with 495 strikeouts. He made 83 starts and notched 16 complete games and two shutouts. He earned nine saves as a relief pitcher.

References

External links

 

1926 births
1997 deaths
Baltimore Orioles players
Baseball players from Detroit
Baseball players from Michigan
Birmingham Barons players
Boston Red Sox players
Buffalo Bisons (minor league) players
Chicago Cubs players
Chicago White Sox players
Dallas Rangers players
Detroit Tigers players
Indianapolis Indians players
Louisville Colonels (minor league) players
Major League Baseball pitchers
Memphis Chickasaws players
Milwaukee Braves players
Minor league baseball managers
New York Giants (NL) players
Oneonta Red Sox players
Pittsburgh Pirates players
Roanoke Red Sox players
St. Louis Browns players
St. Louis Cardinals players
Scranton Red Sox players
Wellsville Nitros players
Wichita Braves players
United States Navy personnel of World War II